Tuxentius margaritaceus, the Margarita's Pierrot or mountain pied Pierrot, is a butterfly in the family Lycaenidae.

Range and habitat 

It is found in Nigeria, Cameroon, the highlands of Angola, the DRC (Uele, Ituri, Kivu, Maniema and Sankuru), southern Sudan, Uganda, central and western Kenya and northern Tanzania. The habitat consists of sub-montane forests and moist savanna, especially along river courses in mountainous regions.

Habits and food plant
Adult males mud-puddle. The larvae feed on Gouania longispicata.

References

Butterflies described in 1892
Polyommatini
Butterflies of Africa